Tioga County  is a county in the U.S. state of New York. As of the 2020 census, the population was 48,455. Its county seat is Owego. Its name derives from an American Indian word meaning "at the forks", describing a meeting place.

Tioga County is part of the Binghamton, NY Metropolitan Statistical Area.

History

In 1789, Montgomery County was reduced in size by the splitting-off of Ontario County. The actual area split off from Montgomery County was much larger than the present county, also including the present Allegany, Cattaraugus, Chautauqua, Erie, Genesee, Livingston, Monroe, Niagara, Orleans, Steuben, Wyoming, Yates, and part of Schuyler and Wayne counties.

Tioga County was one of three counties split off from Montgomery County (the others being Herkimer and Otsego Counties) in 1791. Tioga County was at this time much larger than the present county, also including the present Broome and Chemung counties and parts of Chenango and Schuyler counties.

Tioga County was reduced in size in 1798 by the splitting-off of Chemung County (which also included part of the present Schuyler County and by the combination of a portion with a portion of Herkimer County to create Chenango County. In 1806 it was further reduced by the splitting-off of Broome County.

Geography

Tioga County is in southwest New York State, west of Binghamton and directly north of the border with Pennsylvania.  The Susquehanna River flows into Pennsylvania from this county.  The county is considered part of the Southern Tier region of New York State.

The highest elevation is an unnamed  hill in the county's northern corner.

Adjacent counties
 Cortland County - northeast
 Broome County - east
 Susquehanna County, Pennsylvania - southeast
 Bradford County, Pennsylvania - south
 Chemung County - west
 Tompkins County - northwest

Major highways
 
 
  New York State Route 17C
  New York State Route 38
  New York State Route 96
  New York State Route 96B

Demographics

2020 Census

2010
As of the census of 2010, there were 51,125 people living in the county, with 22,203 housing units, of these 20,350 (91.3%) occupied, 1,853 (8.3%) vacant.  The population density was 98 people per square mile (38/km2).  The racial makeup of the county was 96.9% White, 0.7% African American, 0.2% Native American, 0.7% Asian, 0.01% Pacific Islander, 0.3% from other races, and 1.1% from two or more races. Hispanic or Latino of any race were 1.4% of the population.

2000
As of the census of 2000, there were 51,784 people, 19,725 households, and 14,320 families living in the county. The population density was 100 people per square mile (39/km2). There were 21,410 housing units at an average density of 41 per square mile (16/km2). The racial makeup of the county was 97.52% White, 0.54% African American, 0.22% Native American, 0.57% Asian, 0.01% Pacific Islander, 0.21% from other races, and 0.92% from two or more races. Hispanic or Latino of any race were 0.98% of the population. 16.6% were of German, 16.4% English, 14% Irish, 9.6% Italian, 5% Polish and 4% Dutch ancestry according to Census 2000. 96.9% spoke English and 1.6% Spanish as their first language.

There were 19,725 households, out of which 34.70% had children under the age of 18 living with them, 58.70% were married couples living together, 9.80% had a female householder with no husband present, and 27.40% were non-families. 22.40% of all households were made up of individuals, and 9.40% had someone living alone who was 65 years of age or older.  The average household size was 2.60 and the average family size was 3.04.

In the county, the population was spread out, with 27.00% under the age of 18, 7.00% from 18 to 24, 28.80% from 25 to 44, 24.00% from 45 to 64, and 13.10% who were 65 years of age or older.  The median age was 38 years. For every 100 females there were 97.60 males.  For every 100 females age 18 and over, there were 93.90 males.

The median income for a household in the county was $40,266, and the median income for a family was $46,509. Males had a median income of $32,161 versus $23,653 for females. The per capita income for the county was $18,673. About 6.0% of families and 8.4% of the population were below the poverty line, including 10.0% of those under age 18 and 4.2% of those age 65 or over. There were 8,784 men of military age residing in the county.

Communities

Towns

 Barton
 Berkshire
 Candor
 Newark Valley
 Nichols
 Owego
 Richford
 Spencer
 Tioga

Villages
 Candor
 Newark Valley
 Nichols
 Owego (county seat)
 Spencer
 Waverly

Census-designated places
 Apalachin
 Crest View Heights
 Tioga Terrace

Hamlet
 Lounsberry

Politics

|}

See also

 List of counties in New York
 National Register of Historic Places listings in Tioga County, New York

References

Further reading

External links

  Tioga County, NY
  Tioga County Historical Society
  Tioga County information
 
  Formation of Tioga County and its towns

 
1791 establishments in New York (state)
Binghamton metropolitan area
Counties of Appalachia
New York placenames of Native American origin